George W. Adams House is a registered historic building near Trinway, Ohio, listed in the National Register on 1979-11-29.   This building is being restored and is open to visitors on the weekends and offers ghost tours.

Historic uses 
Single Dwelling

See also
 Prospect Place

References 

National Register of Historic Places in Muskingum County, Ohio
Houses on the National Register of Historic Places in Ohio
Houses in Muskingum County, Ohio
Greek Revival houses in Ohio